Sudeten Creche was a British synthpop band formed in 1980 as a semi Warholian experiment by Yvette Döll. The original lineup featured Yvette Döll and Paul Carlin, working with associate band members over the years. The band was largely known for the minimal electronic tracks "Are Kisses Out of Fashion?" and "Dance", which featured on their first release called Europe in the Year Zero. This EP also included the Yazoo track "Goodbye 70's" and was the first official release by Yazoo which preceded their album Upstairs at Eric's. Also featured on the EP were Colour Me Pop, formerly known as Watch with Mother.

Sudeten Creche’s second release was the EP Kindergarten in 1983 through Illuminated Records. It included the tracks "Kindergarten", "Dance" (instrumental and extended mix) and "Asylums in Beirut".

References

External links
Official website
Sudeten Creche on Discogs

British synth-pop new wave groups
English pop music groups
English new wave musical groups